This is a list of German weapons of World War I.

Infantry weapons

 Bayard M1908 (semi-automatic pistol)
 Beholla M1915 (pistol)
 Bergmann–Bayard M1910 (semi-automatic pistol)
 Bergmann MP 18-I (submachine gun)
 Dreyse M1907 (semi-automatic pistol)
 Flachmine 17 (anti-tank mine)
 Frommer M1912 Stop (pistol)
 GRC Gewehr 88/05, Gewehr 88/14, Gewehr 91 and Karabiner 88  (carbine and rifle)
 Hebel M1894 (flare gun)
 Lance
 Langenhan M1914 Selbstlader (semi-automatic pistol)
 Luger P04 and P08 (pistol)
 M1873 Artilleriesäbel (sword)
 M1889 Infanteriesäbel (sword)
 M1913 Karabingranate (carbine grenade)
 M1914 Karabingranate (carbine grenade)
 M1917 Karabingranate (carbine grenade)
 M1913 Kugelhandgranate (hand grenade)
 M1915 Kugelhandgranate NA (hand grenade)
 M1915 Diskushandgranate (offensive version and defensive version hand grenade)
 M1915, M1916 and M1917 Stielhandgranate (hand stickgrenade)
 M1917 Eierhandgranate (hand grenade)
 Mauser C78 and C86 Zig-Zag (revolver)
 Mauser C96 (semi-automatic pistol)
 Mauser Gewehr 71 and 71/84 (rifle)
 Mauser Gewehr 98 (rifle)
 Mauser Karabiner 98A (carbine version of the Mauser Gewehr 98 rifle)
 Mauser M1887 (rifle)
 Mauser M1910 and M1914 (semi-automatic pistol)
 Mauser M1915 and M1916 Selbstlader (semi-automatic rifle)
 Mondragón M1908 (semi-automatic rifle)
 Reichsrevolver M1879 and M1883
 Schwarzlose M1908 (semi-automatic pistol)
 Seitengewehr 84/98 III (bayonet)
 Seitengewehr 98/05 (bayonet)
 Steyr M1912 (semi-automatic pistol)
 Walther 4 (semi-automatic gun, also known as vest gun)
 Werder M1869 (rifle)

Machine guns

 Bergmann MG 15 (water cooled version heavy machine gun)
 Bergmann MG 15nA (air cooled version light machine gun)
 Gast M1917
 Madsen M1902
 Maxim machine gun
 MG 18 TuF (heavy anti-tank and anti-aircraft machine gun)
 MG 99, MG 01, MG 08, MG 08/15, MG 08/18 and MG 09
 Parabellum MG 14 and MG 14/17 (lightweight redesign of the MG 08)
 Schmeisser-Dreyse MG 12, MG 15 and MG 18

Special weapons

 7.58 cm M1914 leicht Minenwerfer
 7.62 cm Infanteriegeschütz L/16.5
 7.7 cm Infanteriegeschütz L/20
 7.7 cm Infanteriegeschütz L/27
 17 cm M1913 mittler Minenwerfer
 25 cm M1910 schwer Minenwerfer
 Albrecht 24 cm M1917 schwer Flügelminenwerfer
 Albrecht 25 cm M1916 schwer Minenwerfer
 Becker 2 cm M2 (anti-tank and anti-aircraft gun)
 Ehrhardt 24 cm M1915 schwer Ladungswerfer
 Flammenwerfer M1916
 Granatenwerfer 16
 Grossflammenwerfer M1911
 IKO 24 cm M1917 schwer Flügelminenwerfer
 Kleinflammenwerfer M1911
 Lanz 9.15 cm M1914 leicht Minenwerfer
 Mauser 1.3 cm M1918 Tankgewehr (anti-tank rifle)
 Sauterelle (grenade launching crossbow captured from the French)
 Wechselapparat Flammenwerfer M1917

Artillery

 6 cm S-Bts K L/21 (landing gun)
 7.5 cm Gebirgskanone L/13 C/80 (mountain gun)
 7.5 cm Gebirgskanone L/14 M1913 (mountain gun)
 7.62 cm FlaK L/30 (anti-aircraft gun)
 7.7 cm FlaK L/27 (anti-aircraft gun)
 7.7 cm FlaK L/35 (anti-aircraft gun)
 7.7 cm FK 96 (field gun)
 7.7 cm FK 96 n.A. (field gun)
 7.7 cm FK 16 (field gun)
 7.7 cm Kanone in Haubitzelafette (field gun on howitzer carriage)
 8 cm Kanone C/73
 8 cm Kanone C/80
 8.8 cm Flak 16 (anti-aircraft gun)
 9 cm Kanone C/73
 9 cm Kanone C/79
 10 cm K 04
 10 cm K 14
 10 cm K 17
 10.5 cm Feldhaubitze 98/09 (field howitzer)
 10.5 cm Gebirgshaubitze L/12 (mountain gun)
 10.5 cm leFH 16 (light field howitzer)
 12 cm Kanone C/80
 13.5 cm K 09
 15 cm Kanone 16
 15 cm L/40 Feldkanone i.R. (field gun)
 15 cm Ring Kanone C/72
 15 cm Ring Kanone C/92
 15 cm Ring Kanone L/30
 15 cm sFH 93 (heavy field howitzer)
 15 cm sFH 02 (heavy field howitzer)
 15 cm sFH 13 (heavy field howitzer)
 15 cm SK "Nathan"
 17 cm SK L/40 i.R.L. auf Eisenbahnwagen
 21 cm L/14.5 Mörser 16 (mortar)
 21 cm Mörser 10 (mortar)
 21 cm Mörser 99 (mortar)
 21 cm SK "Peter Adalbert"
 21 cm Versuchmörser 06 (mortar)
 24 cm SK L/30 "Theodor Otto"
 24 cm SK L/40 "Theodor Karl"
 28 cm Haubitze L/12 (howitzer)
 28 cm Haubitze L/14 i.R. (howitzer)
 28 cm K L/40 "Kurfürst" (six 28 cm MRK L/40 naval guns were converted to railway guns)
 28 cm SK L/40 "Bruno" (28 cm SK L/40 gun naval guns were converted to railway guns)
 38 cm SK L/45 "Max" (long range coast-defence gun and siege gun)
 42 cm Gamma Mörser (siege gun)
 42 cm kurze MK 14 L/12 (siege gun, also known as "Bertha")
 Ehrhardt 7.5 cm Model 1904 (mountain gun)
 Gruson 5.3cm L/24 Fahrpanzer (mobile artillery turret)
 Krupp 3.7 cm L/14.5 Sockelflugzeugabwehrkanone (anti-aircraft gun)
 Krupp 7.5 cm Model 1903 (field gun)
 Paris Gun (also known as 21 cm "Wilhelm")
 Rheinmetall 3.7 cm M1918 Tankabwehrkanone (anti-tank gun)

Other vehicles

 A7V Flakpanzer 1918  (anti-aircraft tank)
 A7V Schutzengrabenbagger 1918 (trench digger)
 A7V Sturmpanzerwagen 1917 (heavy tank)
 A7V Uberlandwagen 1917 (supply carrier)
 Benz-SAG BL10 panzerkraftwagen 1912 (armored truck)
 Büssing A5P 1915 (armored car)
 Bussing Kraftzugwagen KZW 1800 1916 (gun carrier)
 Daimler Marienfelde ALZ 13 1913 (supply truck)
 Daimler Marienwagen II halbspur 1916 (supply halftrack)
 Daimler Marienwagen II gepanzerter halbspur 1917 (armored halftrack)
 Daimler Marienwagen II tankabwehrkanone 1918 (anti-tank halftrack)
 Daimler Panzerautomobil 1915 (armored car)
 Duhrkopp (Dur) Wagen 1916 (supply carrier)
 Ehrhardt E-V/4 (early version 1915 and late version 1917 armored car)
 Ehrhardt Gepanzerter triebwagen 1917 (armored railcar)
 Lanz Gleiskettenschlepper 1918 (supply carrier)
 Leicht kampfwagen II 1918 (light tank that was rarely used conducting escorts and never saw combat)
 Mannesmann Motoren und Lastwagen AG panzerkraftwagen 1916 (armored truck)
 Nacke 3.5t 1913 (supply truck)
 Nacke 5t 1915 (supply truck)
 NSU 3 1.2 PS 1914 (sidecar motorcycle)
 Opel 4t 1915 (supply truck)
 Porsche Generatorzugwagen 1916 (gun carrier)

Ships

 A class torpedo boat
 List of ships of the Imperial German Navy

Submarines

 List of German U-boats#World War I–era U-boats

Airships

 Gross-Basenach M-IV
 Parseval PL-19
 Parseval PL-25
 List of Schütte-Lanz airships
 List of Zeppelin airships

Airplanes
Note that those airplanes were mainly used.

 AEG C.IV
 AEG G.II
 Ago C.I
 Albatros C.III
 Albatros D.II
 Albatros D.III
 Albatros D.V
 Albatros G.III
 Albatros W.4
 Aviatik C.I
 Aviatik D.I
 DFW C.V
 DFW R.I
 Fokker E.I
 Fokker E.II
 Fokker E.III
 Fokker E.IV
 Fokker D.VII
 Fokker D.VIII (also known as E.V)
 Fokker Dr.I (also known as F.I)
 Friedrichshafen G.III
 Gotha G.IV
 Junkers D.I (also known as J9)
 Junkers J.I (also known as J4)
 Halberstadt CL.II
 Halberstadt D.II
 Hannover CL.III
 LFG Roland C.II
 LFG Roland D.II
 LVG C.V
 Pfalz D.III
 Pfalz D.XII
 Rumpler C.IV
 Rumpler G.I
 Siemens-Schuckert SSW R.I
 Zeppelin-Dornier RS.III
 Zeppelin-Staaken R.VI

References

Citations

Bibliography

 
 
 
 
 

World War I weapons of Germany